KDDD (800 AM) is a radio station broadcasting an oldies music format. Licensed to Dumas, Texas, United States, the station serves the Amarillo, Texas, area. The station is currently owned by Grant Merrill, through Southwest Media Group - Dumas LLC, and features programming from True Oldies Channel.

Previous owner PBI, LLC and Paramount Broadcasting Corporation signed a five-year LMA-agreement that allowed the "All Ag, All Day" programming to be broadcast across the entire Texas and Oklahoma panhandles. Coverage also included southwestern Kansas, southeastern Colorado and northeastern New Mexico.

KDDD AM and FM history
Previous Ownership:

1956-1988 Ken Duke
1988-1990 George ?, Jay Spiegel, Bub Smith
1990-1997 Dick Hoff
1997-2000 Phill Halland
2000-2004 Joel Williamson
2004-2006 Eddie Tubbs & Darrell Wait
2006-2019 Darrell Wait & Darren Stallwitz 
2019  Carienne Carstater
2022 - Grant Merrill, Ben Buckland

1956 to 1988
Until 2019 KDDD AM and FM, known as K Triple D, had its most successful years under the ownership of Ken Duke.  Duke used and trademarked the popular Ding Dong Daddy from Dumas mascot, that is still used today as part of the stations logo.  The trademark was lent to the Dumas Moore County Chamber of Commerce for marketing purposes for the town. 
 
Also during this time, rock n roll history was made in 1957, when a local group known as the Rhythm Orchids, featuring Dumas residents Jimmy Bowen, and Don Lanier, both performers on K Triple D AM, teamed up with singer Buddy Knox of Happy, TX in college.  At the famed Norman Petty Studios in Clovis, NM they recorded the songs "Party Doll" and I'm Sticking With You", and started the small label Triple D Records, named after the radio station.

Roulette Records in New York, bought out the Triple D Records label, and released both songs, with the Buddy Knox and the Orchids name on Party Doll.  The song went to #1 on the national charts, while Jimmy Bowen singing lead on I'm Sticking With You, going to #14.  The boys were instant stars.

Also during this time, Buddy Holly, friends of Knox and the Orchids, performed in concert in downtown Dumas in front of the Evelyn Theater (which still exists) on June 21, 1957.  "That'll Be The Day" was climbing the charts at this time, and went to #1 in October, launching his iconic career.

KDDD AM during these years was mostly country, while KDDD FM was beautiful music and then mellow rock, known as Mellow Rock 95.3, with the call letters KMRE.

2004-2019
After struggling for years under different owners, the stations we're saved by local resident, and sports play by play man Darrell Wait.  With the help of partners, including Moore County resident and farmer Darren Stallwitz, the stations were saved and made solid again.  During this time period, much local Dumas Demon and Demonette sports have been aired.  For their eleven years of ownership KDDD-FM was oldies.

In 2018, they wanted to sell the stations, and found a buyer in broadcast veteran Chris Lash of Tennessee.  Lash changed the FM station from its long time oldies format, to classic country, known now as Big Country 95.3 K Triple D.

Plans are now in the works for KDDD AM, which has been an all ag format, leased by a group in Floyada, TX for the past five years.  KDDD AM went all Christmas music on Black Friday, 2019, and will feature a new format on December 26, 2019. KDDD AM, known in the past as the "Voice of the High Plains", has one of the larger daytime AM signals on the Panhandle of Texas.

Planned also in 2020, is a revival of the Buddy Holly concert in 1957, at the towns annual Dogie Days celebration.

Both stations stream from the website www.bigcountry953.com.

On November 29, 2019, the station dropped their agricultural news format and began playing Christmas music. They announced via their social media that they would introduce a new, permanent format on December 26. The station subsequently introduced an oldies format using True Oldies Channel programming.

References

External links

DDD (AM)
Oldies radio stations in the United States
Radio stations established in 1948
1948 establishments in Texas